James Bush may refer to:

 James Bush (sportsman) (1850–1924), English sportsman
 James Bush (RFC officer) (1891–1917), UK World War I ace
 James Bush (politician) (born 1955), member of the Florida House of Representatives
 James Smith Bush (1825–1889), attorney, Episcopal priest, and religious writer
 James Bush (actor) (1907–1987), actor in American films of the 1930s and 1940s
 James Wood Bush (c. 1844/8–1906), American Civil War veteran from the Kingdom of Hawaii